Aileen Britton (18 February 1916 in Sydney – 19 April 1986) credited also as Aileen Britain, was an Australian character actress of theatre, radio, television, and film (TV movie and theatrical), with a career in the industry spanning nearly 50 years.

Britton made her debut in a film Tall Timbers in 1937, she then worked primarily exclusively in theatre roles and having been signed with the Independent Theatre

Britton post-theatre was a staple of the small screen, where she usually played quirky elderly ladies, mothers and grandmothers, in TV series Television credits include Number 96 Matlock Police, The Restless Years, The Sullivans, Prisoner, and A Country Practice.

Filmography (selected)

FILM

TELEVISION

References

External links
 
 
 Aileen Britton at National Film and Sound Archive

1916 births
1986 deaths
Actresses from Sydney
Australian film actresses
Australian soap opera actresses
20th-century Australian actresses
19th-century Australian women